Stegasta francisci is a moth of the family Gelechiidae. It was described by Bernard Landry in 2010. It is found on the Galápagos Islands and in continental Ecuador.

References

Moths described in 2010
Stegasta